Epidote Peak is a prominent rock peak just north of the mouth of Held Glacier, overlooking the west side of Shackleton Glacier in the Queen Maud Mountains of Antarctica. It was so named by the Texas Tech Shackleton Glacier Expedition, 1964–65, because of the abundance of the mineral epidote which gives the peak a spotted appearance.

References 

Mountains of the Ross Dependency
Dufek Coast